The Gold of Naples is a 1954 Italian anthology film directed by Vittorio De Sica. It was entered into the 1955 Cannes Film Festival.

Plot
The film is a tribute to Naples, where director De Sica spent his first years, this is a collection of 6 Neapolitan episodes: a clown exploited by a hoodlum; an unfaithful pizza seller (Loren) losing her wedding ring; the funeral of a child; the impoverished inveterate gambler Count Prospero B. being reduced to force his doorman's preteen kid to play cards with him (and losing regularly); the unexpected and unusual wedding of Teresa, a prostitute; the exploits of "professor" Ersilio Miccio, a "wisdom seller" who "solves problems".

Cast

Segment Teresa

Silvana Mangano – Teresa
Erno Crisa – Don Nicola

Segment Pizze a credito

Sophia Loren – Sofia
Paolo Stoppa – Don Peppino, the widower
Giacomo Furia – Rosario, Sofia's husband
Alberto Farnese – Alfredo, Sofia's lover
Tecla Scarano – Don Peppino's friend

Segment Il professore

Eduardo De Filippo – Don Ersilio Miccio
Tina Pica – the elderly lady

Segment Il guappo

Totò – Don Saverio Petrillo
Lianella Carell – Carolina, Don Saverio's wife

Release
Paramount did not take up its option to release the film in the United States and it wasn't until February 1957 that the film was finally distributed there, being shown at the Paris Theater in New York for 18 weeks, earning the distributor, Distributors Corporation of America, $72,000.

The film consists of segments including "The Racketeer", "Pizza on Credit", "The Gambler" and "Theresa". The segment "A Child is Dead" was not initially released.

The film was voted one of the Ten Best Foreign Language Films of 1957 by The New York Times.

References

External links
 

1950s Italian-language films
1954 films
Italian black-and-white films
Italian anthology films
Films directed by Vittorio De Sica
1954 comedy films
Films set in Naples
Films produced by Carlo Ponti
Films produced by Dino De Laurentiis
Italian comedy films
Films with screenplays by Cesare Zavattini
Films scored by Alessandro Cicognini
1950s Italian films